The 2018 International Tennis Federation (ITF) Women's Circuit is a second-tier tour for women's professional tennis. It is organized by the International Tennis Federation and is a tier below the Women's Tennis Association (WTA) Tour. The ITF Women's Circuit includes tournaments with prize money ranging from $15,000 to $100,000.

Schedule

January–March

April–June

July–September

October–December

Retirement
  Misa Eguchi
  Justyna Jegiołka
  Maria João Koehler
  Jade Lewis
  Tadeja Majerič
  Kristína Schmiedlová
  Keren Shlomo

Participating host nations

Tournament breakdown by event category

Ranking points distribution 

 "+H" indicates that hospitality is provided.

Statistics

These tables present the number of singles (S) and doubles (D) titles won by each player and each nation during the season. The players/nations are sorted by: 
 Total number of titles (a doubles title won by two players representing the same nation counts as only one win for the nation) 
 A singles > doubles hierarchy
 Alphabetical order (by family names for players).

To avoid confusion and double counting, these tables should be updated only after an event is completed.

Key

Titles won by player

Titles won by nation

 Anastasia Dețiuc started representing the Czech Republic in February, she won one singles title while representing Moldova.
 Elena Rybakina started representing Kazakhstan in June, she won one singles and one doubles title while representing Russia. 
 Kseniia Becker started representing Germany in October, she won one doubles title while representing Russia.
 Raluca Șerban started representing Cyprus in December, she won three singles and five doubles titles while representing Romania.

See also 
 2018 WTA Tour
 2018 WTA 125K series
 2018 ATP World Tour
 2018 ATP Challenger Tour
 2018 ITF Men's Circuit

References

External links 
 International Tennis Federation (ITF)

 
2018
2018 in women's tennis